Austrochaperina archboldi is a species of frog in the family Microhylidae.
It is endemic to Papua New Guinea, known only from specimens found in Kratke Range.
Its natural habitat is subtropical or tropical moist montane forests.

References

Austrochaperina
Amphibians of Papua New Guinea
Taxonomy articles created by Polbot
Amphibians described in 2000